The Pasco Stakes is a horse race for three-year-old Thoroughbreds run annually since 1999 at Tampa Bay Downs in Westchase, Florida. A Listed race offering a purse of $125,000, it is run on dirt over a distance of 7 furlongs.

Records
Speed record:
 At 7 furlongs : 1:20.89 by Win Win Win in 2019

Most wins by a jockey:
 3 - Daniel Centeno (2010, 2015, 2016)

Most wins by a trainer:
 2 - Mark Casse (2012, 2013)

Most wins by an owner:
 2 - John C. Oxley (2012, 2013)

Winners

References

Listed stakes races in the United States
Tampa Bay Downs
Horse races in Florida
Flat horse races for three-year-olds
Open sprint category horse races
Recurring sporting events established in 1999
1999 establishments in Florida